Doroodzan Dam is an earthen dam in Fars Province, Iran, about  north of Shiraz.  Completed in 1974 and built primarily for irrigation water storage, flood control, and municipal water storage, the facility is also a hydroelectric dam with an installed electricity generating capability of 10 MW.

See also

List of power stations in Iran

References

Hydroelectric power stations in Iran
Dams in Fars Province
Dams completed in 1974
1974 establishments in Iran